Ronald Michael Francis Jr. (born March 1, 1963) is a Canadian former professional ice hockey centre. He is the general manager of the Seattle Kraken that inaugurated its first season in 2021. Drafted fourth overall in the 1981 NHL Entry Draft, Francis played 23 seasons in the NHL for the Hartford Whalers, Pittsburgh Penguins, Carolina Hurricanes, and Toronto Maple Leafs. Upon retiring from professional ice hockey in 2004, Francis stood second all-time in career assists (1,249), behind only Wayne Gretzky; fifth in career points (1,798); third in games played (1,731); and 27th in career goals (549).

In 2014, Francis was named as the general manager for the Hurricanes, replacing Jim Rutherford, who had been with the franchise ever since the team's move to Raleigh, North Carolina. Two years before, Francis had become a minority owner of the team as part of the five-man investor group, Playmakers Management. In March 2018, he was promoted to the president of hockey operations role. His Hurricanes contract was terminated on April 30, 2018. On July 18, 2019, he was hired as the first general manager of the Seattle Kraken.

In 2017, Francis was named one of the hundred greatest NHL players in history.

Playing career
As a youth, Francis played in the 1975 and 1976 Quebec International Pee-Wee Hockey Tournaments with a minor ice hockey team from Sault Ste. Marie, Ontario.

Francis was drafted by the Hartford Whalers in the first round, fourth overall, of the 1981 NHL Entry Draft. He was a model of consistency and durability, averaging more than a point a game in over 1,700 games in 23 seasons, and (not counting the lockout-shortened 1994–95 season) averaging just under 77 games played a season. His three Lady Byng Trophies attest to his gentlemanly conduct on and off the ice. Francis stands second all-time in career assists behind Wayne Gretzky with 1,249, fifth in career points (1,798), third in games played (1,731), and twenty-sixth in career goals (549).

Francis played almost ten seasons with the Whalers, serving as captain for almost six and setting nearly every offensive record in franchise history. He was traded to the Pittsburgh Penguins on March 4, 1991, with Ulf Samuelsson and Grant Jennings, in exchange for Jeff Parker, Zarley Zalapski, and John Cullen. The trade became a coup for Pittsburgh, where he centred a formidable second line behind Mario Lemieux, as the Penguins won their first Stanley Cup less than three months later. The threat posed by the Francis-centered second line, formidable in its own right, often required opposing teams to throw their best defenseman against two lines, instead of zeroing in on Lemieux's line, thus creating more opportunities for both top lines.  Francis was also known as one of the best face-off men in the NHL in this period, in both the offensive and defensive ends. In power-play and empty-net situations, his key face-off wins often led to Penguin goals.

Francis was indispensable the following year, as Pittsburgh repeated as champions, in leading the team during the absence of Lemieux in the 1992 playoffs – and in scoring the Cup-clinching goal against the Chicago Blackhawks. At the same time, the trade that brought him to Pittsburgh is considered to be one of the most one-sided trades in NHL history (though The Hockey News suggested that Hartford had gotten the better end of the trade at the time); the players Hartford acquired never approached the numbers or impact Francis produced there or with Pittsburgh. Francis would spend seven seasons in Pittsburgh, captaining the team twice, and becoming the first Penguin to win the Selke Trophy in 1995.

Francis returned to his original organization as a free agent for 1998–99, signing with the Carolina Hurricanes (who had moved from Hartford the previous season). He spent the next 5.5 seasons padding his franchise records. He still ranks first all-time in Whalers/Hurricanes history in points, goals, assists and games played.  At the time of his retirement, his 1,175 points were more than double those of then-runner up Kevin Dineen.  He captained the Hurricanes to a surprise appearance in the 2002 Stanley Cup Finals and scored the winning goal for the Hurricanes in overtime of Game 1, before losing to the Detroit Red Wings in five games.

Francis finished his career with a brief stint with the Toronto Maple Leafs, traded there by the Hurricanes in March 2004 to allow him one last run at the Stanley Cup. He retired from the NHL before the 2005–06 season and assumed a position with the Raleigh Youth Hockey Association.

Management career
In June 2011, Francis assumed the position of director of hockey operations with the Carolina Hurricanes before later being named general manager of the team in 2014. On March 7, 2018, Francis was named president of hockey operations by new Hurricanes' majority owner Thomas Dundon. His Hurricanes contract was terminated on April 30, 2018. On July 18, 2019, Francis was named the first general manager of the Seattle Kraken.

Personal life
Francis was born in Sault Ste. Marie, Ontario, Canada. He is second cousins with Mike Liut.

Francis is married to the former Mary Lou Robie, a native of Stamford, Connecticut, whom he met in Hartford during his tenure with the Whalers. They married in 1986 and have three children: Kaitlyn (b. 1991), Michael (b. 1993), and Connor (b. 1996). Francis is considered a popular sports figure in Hartford, Pittsburgh and Raleigh, and is also noted for his humanitarian and charity work. Francis also has the distinction of being the first ice hockey player inducted into the North Carolina Sports Hall of Fame.

Awards and achievements
Francis won two Stanley Cups, in 1990–91 and the following season, with the Pittsburgh Penguins. Statistically, his best season was 1995–96, when he recorded 119 points; that season, he led the NHL in assists, with 92. The previous season, he had not only led the League in assists with 48 over the lockout-shortened, half-season schedule, but became the first player to win both the Frank J. Selke Trophy and the Lady Byng Trophy in the same season.

Francis' Whalers number 10 jersey was raised at the Hartford Civic Center on January 6, 2006 (though not officially retired, the Whalers organization no longer existing in Hartford to retire it), along with Ulf Samuelsson's number 5 and Kevin Dineen's number 11. Additionally, his Hurricanes number 10 jersey was retired by the Carolina organization on January 28, 2006. He was also pictured in the Pittsburgh Penguins Ring of Honor that formerly circled the upper level of the Pittsburgh Civic Arena.

On June 28, 2007, Francis was selected to enter the Hockey Hall of Fame in his first year on the ballot. He was formally inducted on November 12, 2007.

 NHL All-Star Game – 1983, 1985, 1990, 1996
 Stanley Cup champion – 1991, 1992
 NHL Plus-Minus Award – 1995
 Frank J. Selke Trophy – 1995.
 Lady Byng Trophy – 1995, 1998, 2002
 King Clancy Memorial Trophy – 2002
 Inducted into the Hockey Hall of Fame in 2007
 Currently in 5th place of all-time regular season NHL point leaders with 1,798 points
 Currently in 28th place of all-time regular season NHL goals with 549 goals
 Currently in 2nd place of all-time regular season NHL assists with 1,249 assists
 Currently in 4th place on all-time NHL regular season games played with 1,731 games

Transactions
June 10, 1981: Drafted 4th overall by the Hartford Whalers in the 1981 NHL Entry Draft.
March 4, 1991: Traded to the Pittsburgh Penguins, along with Grant Jennings and Ulf Samuelsson, in exchange for John Cullen, Jeff Parker, and Zarley Zalapski.
July 13, 1998: Signed a four-year, $20.8 million contract as a free agent with the Carolina Hurricanes.
July 29, 2002: Re-signed with Carolina to a two-year, $11 million contract.
March 9, 2004: Traded to the Toronto Maple Leafs in exchange for Toronto's 4th round selection in the 2005 Draft (later traded to the Columbus Blue Jackets, Columbus selected Jared Boll).
September 14, 2005: Announced his retirement from the NHL after 22 seasons.

Career statistics

Regular season and playoffs

International

See also
 List of NHL statistical leaders
 List of NHL players with 1,000 points
 Notable families in the NHL
 List of NHL players with 500 goals
 List of NHL players with 100 point seasons
 List of NHL players with 1,000 assists
 List of NHL players with 1,000 games played

References

External links
 
 Carolina Hurricanes bio

1963 births
Living people
Canadian ice hockey centres
Canadian people of Italian descent
Carolina Hurricanes captains
Carolina Hurricanes coaches
Carolina Hurricanes executives
Carolina Hurricanes players
Frank Selke Trophy winners
Hartford Whalers captains
Hartford Whalers draft picks
Hartford Whalers players
Hockey Hall of Fame inductees
Ice hockey people from Ontario
King Clancy Memorial Trophy winners
Lady Byng Memorial Trophy winners
National Hockey League All-Stars
National Hockey League first-round draft picks
National Hockey League players with retired numbers
National Hockey League general managers
Pittsburgh Penguins players
Sault Ste. Marie Greyhounds players
Sportspeople from Sault Ste. Marie, Ontario
Seattle Kraken executives
Stanley Cup champions
Toronto Maple Leafs players
Canadian ice hockey coaches